Merir, or Melieli, is a small outlying island of the Palau group, in the western Pacific Ocean. It is uninhabited. An abandoned village which previously hosted a radio station lies in the northwest part of the island. 

The island itself is covered with trees but it is surrounded by a beach around which is a lagoon. Outside this, the whole is surrounded by a coral reef and the open ocean.

The first recorded sighting of Merir by Europeans was by the Spanish missionary expedition commanded by Sargento Mayor Francisco Padilla on board of the patache Santísima Trinidad in November 1710.

Gallery

References

External links

Islands of Palau
Sonsorol